Dahrran Diedrick (born January 11, 1979) is a former professional Canadian football running back in the Canadian Football League (CFL). He was signed by the San Diego Chargers as an undrafted free agent in 2003 and drafted by the Edmonton Eskimos in the third round of the 2002 CFL Draft. Diedrick played for eight seasons with the Montreal Alouettes where he won two Grey Cup championships. He played college football at Nebraska.

Dahrran has also been a member of the Green Bay Packers, Washington Redskins and Hamilton Tiger-Cats.

His professional football career came to an end during the 2014 CFL season when he was diagnosed with hepatosplenic gamma-delta T-cell lymphoma. After having his enlarged spleen removed in August 2015 and multiple rounds of chemotherapy, he underwent a stem-cell transplant in June 2016 with his daughter, Dominique, serving as the donor. As of September 2017, his health had returned and he had spent the 2017 season as a strength and conditioning coach for the Toronto Argonauts.

References

External links
Montreal Alouettes bio 

1979 births
Living people
American football fullbacks
Canadian football fullbacks
Canadian football running backs
Canadian players of American football
Canadian players of Canadian football
Edmonton Elks players
Hamilton Tiger-Cats players
Jamaican players of American football
Jamaican players of Canadian football
Montreal Alouettes players
Nebraska Cornhuskers football players
People from Montego Bay
Rhein Fire players
San Diego Chargers players
Washington Redskins players
Green Bay Packers players